Horrabad (also Romanized as Ḩorrābād and Ḩorābād; also known as Hurābād) is a village in Mashhad-e Miqan Rural District, in the Central District of Arak County, Markazi Province, Iran. At the 2006 census, its population was 273, in 91 families.

About 
Horabad has many farms, because of extensive water. The area is best known for wheat, and is considered the best wheat species in Iran. The local water is from the aqueduct, and is used to produce cereals, wheat, barley, alfalfa, and honey. 

The area is known for cultivation and farming, millet and the industries of florists and carpenters, carpet weaving, gilt, and Jajim weaving.
Horabad village has eleven qanats (English: aqueducts), which have the following names:

Villages and neighborhoods of Hoarabad Farahan

References 

Populated places in Arak County